Robert Wyche Davis (March 15, 1849 – September 15, 1929) was a United States Representative from Florida.

Born near Albany, Georgia, Davis attended public schools. He enlisted in 1863 in the Fifth Georgia Volunteer Infantry Regiment of the Confederate States Army, and served until the surrender of his company on April 26, 1865. He later studied law in Florida. He was admitted to the bar in 1869 and commenced practice in Blakely, Georgia. He moved to Florida in 1879 and practiced law in Green Cove Springs, Clay County, then in Gainesville, Alachua County, and afterward in Palatka, Putnam County. He served as member of the Florida House of Representatives from Clay County in 1884 and 1885, serving as Speaker of the House the latter year.

Davis was elected as a Democratic Representative to the Fifty-fifth and to the three succeeding Congresses (March 4, 1897 – March 3, 1905). He was not a candidate for renomination in 1904 to the Fifty-ninth Congress.

He resumed the practice of law in Palatka, and Tampa, Florida. He moved to Gainesville, Florida, in 1914 and served as register of the United States Land Office at Gainesville 1914-1922. He was editor of the Gainesville Sun and was mayor of Gainesville in 1924 and 1925.

He resumed the practice of law in 1928. He died in Gainesville, Florida, September 15, 1929. He was interred in Evergreen Cemetery in Gainesville.

References

External links
 

1849 births
1929 deaths
Democratic Party members of the United States House of Representatives from Florida
Speakers of the Florida House of Representatives
Democratic Party members of the Florida House of Representatives
Confederate States Army personnel
People from Blakely, Georgia